Nereta Municipality is a former municipality in Selonia, Latvia. The municipality was formed in 2009 by merging Mazzalve Parish, Nereta Parish, Pilskalne Parish and Zalve Parish, with the administrative center being Nereta. As of 2020, the population was 3,284.

On 1 July 2021, Nereta Municipality ceased to exist and its territory was merged into Aizkraukle Municipality.

See also 
 Administrative divisions of Latvia (2009)

References 

 
Former municipalities of Latvia